The 1972–73 UEFA Cup was the second season of the UEFA Cup, a football competition organised by UEFA for clubs affiliated to its member associations. It was won by Liverpool, who beat Borussia Mönchengladbach over two legs in the final. The first leg was played at Anfield in Liverpool, where Liverpool won the match 3–0. Mönchengladbach won the second leg in Germany 2–0 for an aggregate score of 3–2.

Bracket

First round

Summary

|}
1 Hvidovre walkover, HJK withdrew.

Matches

Liverpool won 2–0 on aggregate.

Norrköping won 4–1 on aggregate.

Levski-Spartak won 6–5 on aggregate.

AEK Athens won 4–2 on aggregate.

Beroe Stara Zagora won 10–1 on aggregate.

Twente won 4–2 on aggregate.

Slovan Bratislava won 8–2 on aggregate.

Ruch Chorzów won 3–1 on aggregate.

Dynamo Dresden won 4–2 on aggregate.

Red Star Belgrade won 7–4 on aggregate.

OFK Beograd won 5–3 on aggregate.

Tottenham Hotspur won 12–3 on aggregate.

Viking won 1–0 on aggregate.

Club Brugge won 6–5 on aggregate.

Frem won 5–2 on aggregate.

Budapest Honvéd won 4–0 on aggregate.

Köln won 5–1 on aggregate.

Borussia Mönchengladbach won 9–5 on aggregate.

BFC Dynamo won 3–2 on aggregate.

Feyenoord won 21–0 on aggregate.

Valencia won 4–3 on aggregate.

Grasshoppers won 4–2 on aggregate.

Kaiserslautern won 5–3 on aggregate.

Las Palmas won 4–2 on aggregate.

Inter Milan won 7–1 on aggregate.

Vitória de Setúbal won 6–2 on aggregate.

Ararat Yerevan won 2–0 on aggregate.

Fiorentina won 5–1 on aggregate.

Olympiacos won 3–1 on aggregate.

CUF Barreiro won 3–0 on aggregate.

Porto won 4–1 on aggregate.

Hvidovre walkover, HJK withdrew.

Second round

Summary

|}

Matches

Köln won 9–2 on aggregate.

Liverpool won 6–1 on aggregate.

Beroe Stara Zagora won 3–1 on aggregate.

BFC Dynamo won 3–2 on aggregate.

Red Star Belgrade won 4–1 on aggregate.

Kaiserslautern won 3–2 on aggregate.

Dynamo Dresden won 4–0 on aggregate.

Borussia Mönchengladbach won 6–1 on aggregate.

Twente won 9–0 on aggregate.

Ararat Yerevan won 7–3 on aggregate.

5–5 on aggregate; OFK Beograd won on away goals.

Tottenham Hotspur won 4–1 on aggregate.

Inter Milan won 4–2 on aggregate.

Las Palmas won 3–2 on aggregate.

2–2 on aggregate; Vitória de Setúbal won on away goals.

Porto won 5–3 on aggregate.

Third round

Summary

|}

Matches

Borussia Mönchengladbach won 5–0 on aggregate.

Liverpool won 3–1 on aggregate.

OFK Beograd won 3–1 on aggregate.

2–2 on aggregate; Kaiserslautern won on penalties.

Twente won 4–2 on aggregate.

Tottenham Hotspur won 2–1 on aggregate.

Dynamo Dresden won 3–1 on aggregate.

Vitória de Setúbal won 2–1 on aggregate.

Quarter-finals

Summary

|}

Matches

Borussia Mönchengladbach won 9–2 on aggregate.

Twente won 4–3 on aggregate.

Liverpool won 3–0 on aggregate.

2–2 on aggregate; Tottenham won on away goals.

Semi-finals

Summary

|}

Matches

2–2 on aggregate; Liverpool won on away goals.

Borussia Mönchengladbach won 5–1 on aggregate.

Final

Summary

|}

Matches

Liverpool won 3–2 on aggregate.

References

External links
 
 
 
 
 

UEFA Cup seasons
2